Zarjaz is a comics anthology fanzine for the long-running British science fiction comic 2000 AD.

Publication history
Zarjaz was started in 2001 by Andrew J. Lewis. The fanzine contained comic strips based on various 2000 AD characters and also ran an in-depth interview with writer Alan Moore. There were contributions from established 2000 AD creators like Alan Grant and gave a start to others such as Adrian Bamforth and Simon Spurrier.  It was originally printed in A4 format and reproduced cheaply giving it something of the feel of the original 2000 AD comic as it appeared in the 70s and early 80s.  Issues 3 and 4 were printed in the smaller A5 size in an attempt to keep costs low and were published simultaneously.

After four issues, Zarjaz was re-launched in 2005 by Colin J. Dinnie under the Underfire Comics banner, with whom he had previously edited the small press anthology Rapid Fire. The new run has so far produced seven issues but because the first was an "Issue 0" it is numerically only up to six.  The new series features colour covers as opposed to the black and white of the original run.

Zarjaz is now being produced and published by FutureQuake Publishing, who took over with issue #5 (May 2008), as they had done with the Dogbreath, the Strontium Dog fanzine at issue #15 (December 2006).

Contributors
Contributors have come both from mainstream comics and the small press and include Alan Grant, PJ Holden, Al Ewing and Arthur Wyatt and has helped showcase for some of the newest generation of 2000 AD writers and artists like Simon Spurrier, Adrian Bamforth and Nick Dyer.

It has also featured interviews with major 2000 AD talent (from the past and present) including Alan Moore, Alan Grant and Frazer Irving.

There have also been stories which have been picked up and continued in Zarjaz like Al Ewing's "Bones of Eden," the first issue of which appeared in the 2000 AD Winter Special 2005.

Availability
Zarjaz is published twice yearly and sold in comic shops around the UK, including Forbidden Planet, as well as through the internet and mail order.

Awards
In 2002 Zarjaz won the "Best Self-Published/Independent" National Comics Award at the annual Bristol Comic Festival and came second to Jack Staff in 2003. It was also nominated for the "Favourite British Comicbook: Black and White" Eagle Award in 2011.

See also
Dogbreath, the Strontium Dog fanzine

Notes

References

2000 AD's Zarjaz profile

External links
New blog for Zarjaz and Dogbreath (defunct since 2016)
Old blog (defunct since 2008)

Interviews
 New Squaxx On The Block, interview between outgoing editor Colin J Dinnie and incoming editor Dave Evans, February, 2008

2000 AD (comics)
2001 comics debuts
2005 comics debuts
Comics anthologies
British small press comics
Fanzines